Return of Judge Roughneck & Dub Specials  is the follow-up album by Neville Staple to Ska Crazy. The album was released on Cleopatra Records in February 2017.

Track listing

Personnel 
Neville Staple - guitar, vocals 
Christine Sugary Staple - vocals
Steve Armstrong - bass, backing vocals 
Joe Atkinson - keyboards 
Matthew Bane - drums 
Mike Bennett - overdubs 
Stranger Cole, Lynval Golding, Frank Guida, Terry Hall, Herbert Madison, Joseph Royster, Carl Sigman, Peter Tosh - Composers 
Fay Elson - backing vocals 
Gareth John, Jon Pudge - trumpet 
Adam Keary - double bass, strings 
Warren Middleton - trombone, backing vocals 
Paul Sampson - guitar 
Billy Shinbone - guitar 
George Sutton - backing vocals 
Daddy Woody - vocals

References 

2017 albums
Neville Staple albums